Maria Ida Adriana Hoogendijk (1874-1942) was a Dutch painter.

Biography 
Hoogendijk was born on 20 May 1874 in Krimpen aan den IJssel. She studied at the Rijksakademie van beeldende kunsten (State Academy of Fine Arts) in Amsterdam and the  Akademie van beeldende kunsten (Den Haag) (Royal Academy of Art, The Hague). Her teachers included Carel Lodewijk Dake (1857-1918), Jacob Hendrik Geerlings, and  Egbert Schaap. In 1905 she married fellow artist .

Hoogendijk's work was included in the 1939 exhibition and sale Onze Kunst van Heden (Our Art of Today) at the Rijksmuseum in Amsterdam. She was a member of Arti et Amicitiae.

Hoogendijk died on 13 April 1942 in Amsterdam.

References

1874 births
1942 deaths
20th-century Dutch women artists
Dutch painters
People from Krimpen aan den IJssel
Dutch women painters